Ghafour is an Arabic surname. Notable people with this surname include:

 Abdul Ghafour (Taliban commander), Taliban commander 
 Amir Ghafour (born 1991), Iranian volleyball player
 Emad El-Din Abdel-Ghafour, Egyptian politician and co-founder of the Salafist Islamist Homeland Party 
 Hamida Ghafour, Canadian journalist and author of Afghan origin
 Reham Abdel Ghafour (born 1978), Egyptian actress and daughter of the Egyptian actor Ashraf Abdel Ghafour
 Sabi Jahn Abdul Ghafour (199-2004), Afghan prisoner of the Guantanamo Bay detainment camps

Arabic-language surnames